Jonggol is a district (Indonesian: Kecamatan) in the Bogor Regency, West Java, Indonesia.  It is located 50 km to the southeast of Jakarta and is part of the Greater Jakarta metropolitan area. The average elevation is 295 meters, maximum 732 m (1.890 m in Mounth Baud, Sukamakmur, Jonggol District), and minimum 150 meters above sea level. The area was one of the areas considered for new central administration (capital) of the Republic of Indonesia.

Geography

Toll Road Access

Climate
Jonggol has a tropical rainforest climate (Af) with heavy to very heavy rainfall year-round.

Gallery

References

Districts of Bogor Regency